X+Y, released in the US as A Brilliant Young Mind, is a 2014 British drama film directed by Morgan Matthews and starring Asa Butterfield, Rafe Spall and Sally Hawkins.

The film, inspired by the documentary  Beautiful Young Minds, focuses on a teenage English mathematics prodigy named Nathan (Asa Butterfield) who has difficulty understanding people, and is autistic, but finds comfort in numbers. When he is chosen to represent the United Kingdom at the International Mathematical Olympiad (IMO), Nathan embarks on a journey in which he faces unexpected challenges, such as understanding the nature of love. The character of Nathan was based on Daniel Lightwing who won a silver medal at the 2006 IMO.

The film premiered at the Toronto International Film Festival on 5 September 2014. The European premiere was at the BFI London Film Festival on 13 October 2014, and the UK cinema release was on 13 March 2015.

Plot
Nathan Ellis, a 9 year old maths prodigy, has just lost his father in a car accident. Nathan is diagnosed as being on the autism spectrum early in the film, and his father was the only one who was able to connect normally with him. Although Nathan values his mother, Julie, he shuns any physical contact with her and treats her as more of a caretaker than a parent. Wanting to make sure Nathan is not distracted from his studies, Julie enrolls him in advanced classes at a new school (filmed at High Storrs School in Sheffield, United Kingdom). There, he comes under the tutelage of teacher Martin, also a math genius, who has multiple sclerosis. Martin sees himself in Nathan, once a promising young mind in the field of mathematics, who gave it all up once he was diagnosed with his illness.

Seven years later, Martin is preparing Nathan to compete for a place in the International Mathematical Olympiad, a prestigious high school competition consisting of the world's best young mathematicians. This year, it is to be held at Cambridge, after a two-week math camp in Taiwan where the students will study for the test that determines the winners. Nathan fears he is not good enough to qualify but ends up doing well enough to accompany 15 other British teenagers to Taiwan.

Suddenly thrust out of his comfort zone, Nathan finds himself no longer the smartest maths whiz in the room, and his social anxieties nearly paralyse his performance. He has trouble reading the social cues of others and flinches at the slightest physical contact with another person. Nathan is paired with a female Chinese student, Zhang Mei, who slowly helps him adjust to his new surroundings and helps him fight through his fears. By the skin of their teeth, Nathan and Zhang make the cut to compete in Cambridge.

Back in England, Zhang stays with Nathan and his mother, who is shocked to find that his behaviour has transformed into something more normal. She becomes aware that he may have feelings for Zhang, which she asks him. Not fully understanding the concept of love, Nathan is unsure how to express his feelings. He keeps his emotions bottled up as they all travel to Cambridge and settle in for the Olympiad.

Things quickly unravel when Zhang's uncle catches her in Nathan's room one morning. This causes Zhang to withdraw from the competition and leave. Nathan, who now believes he loves Zhang, is torn between her and the Olympiad. When he sits down among hundreds of other students around the world for the exam, the first question triggers memories of his dead father, which combined with his newly lost love, creates an emotional overload. At the pinnacle moment of his mathematical career, Nathan must make a decision whether to stay and pursue his dream, or give in to the pain that has haunted him for most of his life.

Nathan rushes out of the exam hall with Martin and Julie in tow. The latter finds him in a café, where he speaks of his emotional overload, both from the loss of his father and the girl who appreciated and loved him, Zhang Mei. They embrace at last, then Julie drives Nathan to the station to fetch back Zhang Mei.

Cast
Asa Butterfield as Nathan Ellis
Rafe Spall as Martin Humphreys
Sally Hawkins as Julie Ellis
Eddie Marsan as Richard
Jo Yang as Zhang Mei
Jake Davies as Luke Shelton
Alexa Davies as Rebecca
Martin McCann as Michael Ellis
Alex Lawther as Isaac Cooper
Edward Baker-Close as Nathan Ellis (age 9)

Reception
The review aggregator website Rotten Tomatoes reports an 87% approval rating with a weighted average score of 6.58/10 based on 75 reviews. The website's consensus reads, "A Brilliant Young Mind is tender and perceptive – and intelligent enough to find a wealth of dramatic riches buried under well-trod narrative ground." On Metacritic, the film has a score of 65 out of 100 based on 19 critics, indicating "generally favorable reviews."

Departures from the true story
The main character Nathan Ellis is based on mathematical genius Daniel Lightwing who is on the autism spectrum. Lightwing had a teacher who saw his potential and became his mentor; however, his mentor was not a man but a woman named Miggy Biller who is the Head of Maths at York College. Lightwing never lost his father; in fact, his father also attended with him at the film premier. In the film the IMO takes place in Cambridge, England, but the actual event that Lightwing participated in was in Slovenia. The training camp took place in China where Daniel fell in love with a Chinese woman named Zhu Yan whom he married (they are no longer together).

Lightwing's mentor Miggy Biller attended the film's premiere and told the York College newsletter: "We sat beside each other at the showing, chuckling together about some of the film's maths problems. It was funny to look at the line between fact and fiction being trod all the time by the film! Dan's Dad, sitting just behind us, saw himself killed in a car accident … and I don't think I need to say that I didn't recognise myself in Rafe Spall!"  She went on to say, "It's a brilliant and very moving film, and Asa Butterfield is amazing." Lightwing told the Evening Standard, "I cried the first three times I watched it. It says things I was feeling but could not express."

References

External links

2010s coming-of-age comedy-drama films
2010s teen comedy-drama films
2014 films
British coming-of-age comedy-drama films
British teen comedy-drama films
2010s English-language films
Films about autism
Films about mathematics
Films about mother–son relationships
Films shot in Cambridgeshire
Films shot in South Yorkshire
Films shot in Taiwan
International Mathematical Olympiad
Plaion
Samuel Goldwyn Films films
Films about multiple sclerosis
2010s British films